Albert Ganado MOM (born 9 March 1924) is a Maltese lawyer and historian. He is a past president of the Malta Historical Society and the founder and president of the Malta Map Society. He released his memoirs in 2020. Some of his publications have won awards in different categories of the National Book Prize by the National Book Council.

Selected publications
 Malta in British and French Caricature 1798 – 1815. Said International, 1989. (With Joseph C. Sammut) 
 A Study in Depth of 143 Maps Representing the Great Siege of Malta of 1565. Publishers Enterprise Group, 1994. (With Maurice Agius-Vadala) 
 Palace of the Grand Masters in Valletta. Fondazzjoni Patrimonju Malti, 2001. 
 Miniature Maps of Malta. Midsea Books, 2009. 
 German Malta Maps. BDL Publishing, 2011. (With Joseph Schirò)  
 The Brocktorff Mapmakers. BDL Publishing, 2012. (With Joseph Schirò & Claude Micallef Attard) 
 Malta in World War II: Contemporary Watercolours by Alfred Gerada. Midsea Books, [2018].

References

Further reading
 Liber amicorum: Essays on art, history, cartography, and bibliography in honour of Dr. Albert Ganado. University of Malta, 1994.

External links

Living people
1924 births
Historians of cartography
Maltese historians
20th-century Maltese lawyers
Recipients of the National Order of Merit (Malta)
University of Malta alumni